The 2002 Supercoppa Italiana was a match contested by Juventus, the 2001–02 Serie A winner, and Parma, the 2001–02 Coppa Italia winner.
It was the fifth appearance for Juventus (2 victories in 1995 and 1997) and the fourth for Parma (victory in 1999). The teams had already faced each other in the 1995 Supercoppa.
The match was played in Tripoli, Libya and was only the second Supercoppa Italiana to be played outside of Italy, after the 1993 edition in the United States.

Match details

References

2002
Supercoppa 2002
Supercoppa 2002
Supercoppa Italiana